is a picture book series written by Shiro Yadama. Some books were translated into English by Keith Holman. The book is about a boy named Noriyasu Hatakeyama who starts writing "tomorrow's" journal entries when he finds out the days start happening just the way he writes them.

A 30-minute animated film was created by Oh! Production and Gakken and released on August 23, 1988.

An animated television series animated by Group TAC aired on TV Tokyo from July 3, 1997 to September 29, 1998. It was rebroadcast on Tokyo MX from May 6, 2011 to July 29, 2011. When brought to the United States, it was renamed Tokyo Pig. The English dub of Tokyo Pig was produced by Miramax Television and Buena Vista Sound Services and had all the original Japanese music completely replaced with a new musical score and all the original Japanese sound effects completely replaced with new American-made sound effects. It was also translated into Chinese and Tagalog (under the name Sunny Pig). It was broadcast from September 2002 to March 2003 in the United States on ABC Family, and eventually on Cartoon Network Korea in June 2013. It was originally directed by Shinichi Watanabe. Miramax Home Entertainment released Tokyo Pig only on one DVD with no VHS equivalent and having previews for Chicken Little, Bionicle 3: Web of Shadows, Spider-Man: The Venom Saga and Power Rangers S.P.D. playing before the Tokyo Pig DVD on it.

Main characters
  / Spencer Weinberg-Takahama
 

  / Sunny Pig
 

  / Mom
 

  / Dad
 

  / Dizzy Lizzy
 

  / The Weather Lady

Other characters
  / Angus
 

  / Eggman
 

  / Tiffany Van Hootenberg
 

  / Wigstaff
 

  / Sweater Girl
 

  / Ms. Spelt
 

  / Principal Tezuka
 

  / Shadow Lady

  / Mrs. Tingly a.k.a. Lady Fujian

  / Dark Sunny
 

  / Wenworth
 

 Snow Queen

Music
 Theme songs
 Opening
 "Tsuyoki na Futari" (強気なふたり) by Yumi Yoshimura (Episodes 1-17)
 "Karette Tokidoki Buta" (カレって時々ブタ) by TSUNAMi (Episodes 18-36)
 "BOO~Onaka ga Karaku Hodo Warattemitai~" (BOO ～おなかが空くほど笑ってみたい～) by The Gospellers (37-61)

 Ending
 "I'm Home" (ただいま, Tadaima) by Ami Onuki (Episodes 1-17)
 "Airplane Cloud" (ヒコーキ雲, Hikouki Kumo) by Flower Companies (Episodes 18-36)
 "Ah Buta da! 〜Tsuitachi yu kai ni ikiru uta〜" by Delicious Pigs (Episodes 37-61)

Crew

English crew
 Steve Kramer - Voice director

Picture books

Episode list

References

Bibliography
  - NDC913

External links

Shiro Yadama's website 
Hare Tokidoki Buta (TV)  at Tokyo MX's official website 

Children's books adapted into television shows
Children's books adapted into films
Japanese picture books
Series of children's books
Japanese books
1988 anime films
1997 anime television series debuts
1997 Japanese television series debuts
1998 Japanese television series endings
ABC Family original programming
Comedy anime and manga
Discotek Media
Television series by Miramax Television
Group TAC
Pigs in literature
Tokyo MX original programming
TV Tokyo original programming